The Roman Catholic Diocese of Luoyang/Loyang is a diocese located in the city of Luoyang in the Ecclesiastical province of Kaifeng in China.

History
 May 25, 1929: Established as Apostolic Prefecture of Luoyang 洛陽 from the Apostolic Vicariate of Zhengzhou 鄭州
 January 28, 1935: Promoted as Apostolic Vicariate of Luoyang 洛陽
 April 11, 1946: Promoted as Diocese of Luoyang 洛陽

Leadership
 Bishops of Luoyang 洛陽 (Roman rite)
 Bishop Peter Li Hong-ye (1988 - 2011)
 Bishop Assuero Teogano Bassi, S.X. (April 11, 1946 – November 8, 1970)
 Vicars Apostolic of Luoyang 洛陽 (Roman Rite)
 Bishop Assuero Teogano Bassi, S.X. (January 28, 1935 – April 11, 1946)
 Prefects Apostolic of Luoyang 洛陽 (Roman Rite)
 Fr. Assuero Teogano Bassi, S.X. (later Bishop) (January 9, 1930 – January 28, 1935)

References

 GCatholic.org
 Catholic Hierarchy

Roman Catholic dioceses in China
Christian organizations established in 1929
Roman Catholic dioceses and prelatures established in the 20th century
Christianity in Henan
Religion in Luoyang
1929 establishments in China